Melastoma is a genus in the family Melastomataceae. It has over 100 species distributed around Southeast Asia, India, north to Japan, south to Australia and the Pacific Islands. The number of species should probably be reduced according to some sources. Many species have been planted around the world for the aesthetic value of their bright purple flowers.

Species in this genus are native to temperate and tropical Asia, Seychelles, Pacific and Australasia. Several have the capacity to become invasive species, in Hawaii and other areas.

Species 

, Plants of the World Online (PoWO) accepted the following species. An additional species, Melastoma malabituin,  was described in 2020.

 Melastoma aculeolatum Bakh.f.
 Melastoma affine D.Don
 Melastoma ansowii K.M.Wong
 Melastoma apiense K.M.Wong
 Melastoma ariffinii K.M.Wong
 Melastoma ashtonii K.M.Wong
 Melastoma atrofuscum Bakh.f.
 Melastoma aureum Bakh.f.
 Melastoma barioense K.M.Wong
 Melastoma bauchei Guillaumin
 Melastoma beccarianum Cogn.
 Melastoma bensonii Merr.
 Melastoma borijanum Korth.
 Melastoma borneense Bakh.f.
 Melastoma botryanthum K.M.Wong
 Melastoma buennemeyeri Bakh.f.
 Melastoma bukitrayense K.M.Wong
 Melastoma celebicum Blume
 Melastoma ceramense Naudin
 Melastoma chevalieri Guillaumin
 Melastoma collinum K.M.Wong
 Melastoma culionense Merr.
 Melastoma curvisepalum Bakh.f.
 Melastoma cyanoides Sm.
 Melastoma decipiens Bakh.f.
 Melastoma denticulatum Labill.
 Melastoma dodecandrum Lour.  - dì niè (Chinese: 地菍) or de rěn (Chinese: 地稔)
 Melastoma eberhardtii Guillaumin
 Melastoma elbertii Bakh.f.
 Melastoma godeffroyi Reinecke
 Melastoma griffithianum Masters
 Melastoma hansenii K.M.Wong
 Melastoma harmsianum Lauterb.
 Melastoma horridum Bakh.f.
 Melastoma iliasii K.M.Wong
 Melastoma imbricatum Wall. ex Triana - senduduk Putih, senggani putih
 Melastoma impressinervium K.M.Wong
 Melastoma incisum K.M.Wong
 Melastoma × intermedium Dunn
 Melastoma jenkinsii Masters
 Melastoma joffrei K.M.Wong & Y.W.Low
 Melastoma kahayanense K.M.Wong
 Melastoma kemamanense L.Neo & K.M.Wong
 Melastoma klossii Baker f.
 Melastoma koordersii Bakh.f.
 Melastoma kostermansii K.M.Wong
 Melastoma kuchingense K.M.Wong
 Melastoma kudoi Sasaki
 Melastoma lanuginosum Blume
 Melastoma linusii K.M.Wong
 Melastoma longiramense K.M.Wong
 Melastoma magnificum Bakh.f.
 Melastoma malabathricum L. (many synonyms, some recognized as separate species by some sources, including Melastoma affine D.Don and Melastoma septemnervium Lour.) - Malabar melastome, Singapore rhododendron, senduduk, senggani
 Melastoma malabituin J.Agcaoili, Barcelona & Pelser
 Melastoma maraiparaiense K.M.Wong
 Melastoma micans Gilli
 Melastoma microlepidotum K.M.Wong
 Melastoma microphyllum Naudin
 Melastoma minahassae Koord. ex Karst.Mey.
 Melastoma molkenboerii Miq.
 Melastoma molle Wall. ex Cogn.
 Melastoma muticum Ridl.
 Melastoma oreophilum K.M.Wong
 Melastoma oresbium K.M.Wong
 Melastoma orientale Guillaumin
 Melastoma ovalifolium Bakh.f.
 Melastoma paleaceum Naudin
 Melastoma palungense K.M.Wong
 Melastoma patulisetum Ohwi
 Melastoma pellegrinianum (H.Boissieu) Karst.Mey.
 Melastoma penicillatum Naudin
 Melastoma pentapetalum (Toyoda) T.Yamaz. & Toyoda
 Melastoma picklesii K.M.Wong
 Melastoma porphyraeum Zipp. ex Blume
 Melastoma postarii K.M.Wong
 Melastoma praetermissum K.M.Wong
 Melastoma pubescens Bakh.f.
 Melastoma pulongtauense K.M.Wong
 Melastoma robustum Bakh.f.
 Melastoma roemeri Mansf.
 Melastoma runiae K.M.Wong
 Melastoma sabahense Karst.Mey.
 Melastoma saigonense (Kuntze) Merr.
 Melastoma sanguineum Sims - fox-tongued melastoma, blood-red melastoma, red melastome
 Melastoma sarawakense K.M.Wong
 Melastoma scaberrimum (Hayata) Yuen P.Yang & H.Y.Liu
 Melastoma septemnervium Lour.
 Melastoma sibatii K.M.Wong
 Melastoma suave Bakh.f.
 Melastoma subalbidum Merr.
 Melastoma subgrande Hochr.
 Melastoma sugaui K.M.Wong
 Melastoma sumatranum Bakh.f.
 Melastoma sylvaticum Blume
 Melastoma tanjiewhoei K.M.Wong
 Melastoma tetramerum Hayata
 Melastoma toppingii Merr.
 Melastoma trachycaulon Miq.
 Melastoma trachyphyllum Backer ex Bakh.f.
 Melastoma trungii Pócs & Tiep
 Melastoma ultramaficum K.M.Wong
 Melastoma velutinosum Ridl.
 Melastoma vile Bakh.f.
 Melastoma vulcanicum Ridl.
 Melastoma yahudii K.M.Wong
 Melastoma yiianthum K.M.Wong
 Melastoma zollingeri Naudin

References 

 
Melastomataceae genera
Taxa named by Carl Ludwig Blume